The Alstom Metropolis C830 is the first generation of communication-based train control (CBTC) electric multiple unit rolling stock in operation on the Circle line of Singapore's Mass Rapid Transit (MRT) system since 2009. Alstom was contracted in 2000 (as part of turnkey contract Contract C830) by the Land Transport Authority (LTA) in Singapore to supply the trains for the Circle line.

Overview
Despite being similar to the fully underground North East line, the decision was made to power the three-car trains along the Circle line by third rail instead of overhead catenary. 40 trainsets of three cars each were purchased for the Circle line. For the train's tender, Alstom was awarded the contract on 28 December 2000, beating seven pre-qualified contractors.

Although these cars were similar to their counterparts running on the North East line, they do not feature LCD Displays in each car due to lack of demand along Circle line. However, the ceiling-mounted LED dot matrix displays which display information were retained in the design.

In addition, the front of the train features an extra window cut into the emergency exit door unlike the C751A trains, giving passengers a view of the tunnel.

Driverless operation

The C830 is fully driverless under normal circumstances, using CBTC which does not require traditional "fixed-block track circuits" for determining train position. Instead, they rely on "continuous two-way digital communication" between each controlled train and a wayside control center, which may control an area of a railway line, a complete line, or a group of lines. Recent studies consistently show that CBTC systems reduce life-cycle costs for the overall rail property and enhance operational flexibility and control.

Train formation

The configuration of a C830 in revenue service is Mc1–T–Mc2

The car numbers of the trains range from 801x to 840x, where x depends on the carriage type. Individual cars are assigned a four-digit serial number by the rail operator SMRT Trains. A complete three-car trainset consists of one trailer (T) and two driving motor (Mc) cars permanently coupled together. For example, set 801 consists of carriages 8011, 8012 and 8013.

 The first digit is always an 8.
 The second and third digits identify the set number.
 The fourth digit identifies the car number, where the first car has a 1, the second has a 2 and the third has a 3.
 Alstom built sets 801–840.

In popular culture
The train is featured in HBO series Westworld, as part of the third season.

References

External links
 Alstom Metropolis

Mass Rapid Transit (Singapore) rolling stock
Alstom multiple units
Train-related introductions in 2009
750 V DC multiple units